Dream Brother: The Songs of Tim and Jeff Buckley is a studio album performed by various artists in tribute to 1960s musician Tim Buckley, and his son, also a musician, Jeff Buckley. Both father and son died prematurely, Tim Buckley of an overdose and Jeff Buckley in a drowning accident.

Track listing
"Sing a Song for You" (Tim Buckley) performed by The Magic Numbers - 3:27
"Yard of Blonde Girls" (Audrey Clark, Lori Kramer) performed by Micah P. Hinson - 2:58
"She Is" (Tim Buckley, Larry Beckett) performed by Sufjan Stevens - 2:22
"Grace" (Jeff Buckley, Gary Lucas) performed by King Creosote - 5:34
"I Must Have Been Blind" (Tim Buckley) performed by The Earlies - 5:18
"Dream Brother" (Jeff Buckley) performed by Bitmap - 4:52
"Song to the Siren" (Tim Buckley, Larry Beckett) performed by Engineers - 4:32
"Mojo Pin" (Jeff Buckley, Gary Lucas) performed by Adem - 5:05
"No Man Can Find the War" (Tim Buckley, Larry Beckett) performed by Tunng - 5:03
"Morning Theft" (Jeff Buckley) performed by Stephen Fretwell - 3:41
"Buzzin' Fly" (Tim Buckley) performed by Kathryn Williams - 4:07
"Everybody Here Wants You" (Jeff Buckley) performed by Matthew Herbert, Dani Siciliano - 4:48
"The River" (Tim Buckley) performed by Clayhill - 5:54

Personnel
"Sing a Song for You" -The Magic Numbers
"Yard of Blonde Girls" - Micah P. Hinson
"She Is" - Sufjan Stevens
"Grace" - King Creosote
"I Must Have Been Blind" - The Earlies
"Dream Brother" - Bitmap
"Song to the Siren" - Engineers
"Mojo Pin" - Adem
"No Man Can Find the War" - Tunng
"Morning Theft" - Stephen Fretwell: Bass guitar, guitar, percussion, vocals
"Buzzin' Fly" - Kathryn Williams
"Everybody Here Wants You" - Matthew Herbert, Dani Siciliano
"The River" - Clayhill
Matthew Watson - Piano, wurlitzer
Tom Knott - Engineer
Richard Wilkinson - Engineer, Mixing
David Browne - Liner Notes
David Scott - Producer
Kathyrn Williams - Producer
Romeo Stodart - Producer

References

2006 albums
Tribute albums